Table tennis at the 2008 Summer Paralympics was held in the Peking University Gymnasium from September 7 to September 15.

Classification
Players are given a classification depending on the type and extent of their disability. The classification system allows players to compete against others with a similar level of function. Table tennis has ten numbered classes, with lower numbers corresponding to more severe disability. Classes one through five compete in wheelchairs and classes six through ten compete while standing.

Events
Twenty-four events were contested. The events are men's and women's team and individual competitions for the various disability classifications.

Participating countries
There will be 264 athletes (168 male, 96 female) taking part in this sport.

Medal summary

Medal table

This ranking sorts countries by the number of gold medals earned by their players (in this context a country is an entity represented by a National Paralympic Committee). The number of silver medals is taken into consideration next and then the number of bronze medals. If, after the above, countries are still tied, equal ranking is given and they are listed alphabetically.

Men's events

Women's events

See also
Table tennis at the 2008 Summer Olympics

References

External links
Official site of the 2008 Summer Paralympics

 
2008
2008 Summer Paralympics events
Paralympics
Table tennis competitions in China